G106 may refer to:
 China National Highway 106
 WCFS-FM, an AC-formatted radio station licensed to Elmwood Park, Illinois